Cymbilaimus is a genus of passerine birds in the antbird family, Thamnophilidae. 
It contains two species:
 Fasciated antshrike (Cymbilaimus lineatus)
 Bamboo antshrike (Cymbilaimus sanctaemariae)

References

External links 

 
Bird genera
 
Taxa named by George Robert Gray
Taxonomy articles created by Polbot